Orazio Schipano (died 1596) was a Roman Catholic prelate who served as Bishop of Belcastro (1591–1596).

Biography
On 13 November 1591, Orazio Schipano was appointed during the papacy of Pope Gregory XIV as Bishop of Belcastro. He served as Bishop of Belcastro until his death in 1596.

While bishop, he was the principal co-consecrator of Francesco Monaco, Bishop of Martirano (1592).

References

External links and additional sources
 (for Chronology of Bishops) 
 (for Chronology of Bishops) 

16th-century Italian Roman Catholic bishops
Bishops appointed by Pope Gregory XIV
1596 deaths